Claudia Emerson (January 13, 1957 – December 4, 2014) was an American poet. She won the 2006 Pulitzer Prize for her poetry collection Late Wife, and was named the Poet Laureate of Virginia by Governor Tim Kaine in 2008.

Early life
Emerson was born on January 13, 1957, in Chatham, Virginia, and graduated from Chatham Hall preparatory school in 1975. She received her BA in English from the University of Virginia in 1979 and her Master of Fine Arts in creative writing at the University of North Carolina at Greensboro in 1991.

Career
Emerson published eight poetry collections through Louisiana State University Press's Southern Messenger Poets series: Pharaoh, Pharaoh (1997), Pinion: An Elegy (2002), Late Wife (2005), Figure Studies: Poems (2008), Secure the Shadow (2012), Impossible Bottle (2015), The Opposite House (2015) and Claude before Time and Space (2018).

Three collections were published posthumously, The Opposite House (March 2015), Impossible Bottle (September 2015) and Claude before Time and Space (February 2018).

In addition to her collections,  Emerson's work has been included in such anthologies as Yellow Shoe Poets, The Made Thing, Strongly Spent: 50 Years of Shenandoah Poetry, and Common Wealth: Contemporary Poets of Virginia.

Emerson served as poetry editor for the Greensboro Review and a contributing editor for the literary magazine Shenandoah.  
In 2002, Emerson was Guest Editor of Visions-International (published by Black Buzzard Press). On August 26, 2008, she was appointed Poet Laureate of Virginia, by then Governor Timothy M. Kaine and served until 2010.  In 2008, she returned to Chatham Hall to serve as The Siragusa Foundation's Poet-in-Residence.

She taught at several colleges including Washington and Lee University in Lexington, Virginia and Randolph-Macon College in Ashland, Virginia. She spent over a decade at the University of Mary Washington, in Fredericksburg, Virginia, as an English professor and the Arrington Distinguished Chair in Poetry.

In 2013, Emerson joined the creative writing faculty at Virginia Commonwealth University in Richmond, Virginia, where she taught until her death in 2014 from colon cancer at age 57.

Personal life
Emerson married musician Kent Ippolito in 2000. The couple lived in Richmond, Virginia, and performed and wrote songs together. After missing most of the Fall 2014 semester while seeking cancer treatments, Claudia Emerson died on December 4, 2014, in Richmond at the age of 57 from complications associated with colon cancer.

Awards and honors
The Association of Writers and Writing Programs Intro Award, 1991
Academy of American Poets Prize, 1991
National Endowment for the Arts Fellowship, 1994 (As Claudia Emerson Andrews)
Virginia Commission for the Arts Individual Artist Fellowship, 1995 and 2002
University of Mary Washington Alumni Association Outstanding Young Faculty Award, 2003
Erskine J. Poetry Prize, 2004 for "Second Bearing, 1919"
Witter Bynner Fellowship from Library of Congress, 2005
Pulitzer Prize for Poetry, 2006
Poet Laureate of Virginia, 2008–2010
Library of Virginia, Virginia Women in History, 2009
Fellowship of Southern Writers, Inaugural Winner, Donald Justice Award for Poetry, 2009
Guggenheim Fellowship, 2011
Elected to Membership, Fellowship of Southern Writers, 2011

Bibliography

Poetry collections
Pharaoh, Pharaoh. LSU Press. 1997. .

Claude before Time and Space. LSU Press. 2018. .

List of poems

References

External links

 Website for LSU Press with links to pages for books published
 Academy of American Poets Biography, bibliography and links to poems
 Poetry Foundation Biography and links to poems and articles published in Poetry (magazine)
Emerson, Claudia Insistent Places Southern Spaces, October 26, 2009
Claudia Emerson Papers at the Albert and Shirley Small Special Collections Library at the University of Virginia
Pulitzer Prize website, Emerson profile
Library of Congress reading (mp3 format file) Interview and poems 
Kooser, Ted, American Life in Poetry: Column 26—Claudia Emerson's poem "Stable"  Emerson's poems "Migrane, Aura and Aftermath" and "What They Want" in Visions International (issue #67)
 Williams, Susan Settlemyre, "Review | Pinion: An Elegy, by Claudia Emerson", Blackbird: An Online Journal of Literature and the Arts, Virginia Commonwealth University, Richmond, Volume 1, No. 2 December 16, 2002
Cheuse, Alan, Radio interview with Claudia Emerson on With Good Reason, Virginia Commission for the Humanities, May 22, 2004.
Bryne, Edward. "Everything We Cannot See: Claudia Emerson's Late Wife".
Martz, Michael, "Chatham Adds To Literary Legacy" April 26, 2006 (originally published as "Pulitzer-winning poet from Chatham Virginia: Professor latest with ties to town to bask in literary glory," in the Richmond Times Dispatch on April 20, 2006).
 Williams, Susan Settlemyre, "An Interview with Claudia Emerson, Blackbird: An Online Journal of Literature and the Arts, Virginia Commonwealth University, Richmond, Volume 1, No 2 December 16, 2002 transcript and audio file.
 Williams, Susan Settlemyre, "Review | Pinion: An Elegy, by Claudia Emerson", Blackbird: An Online Journal of Literature and the Arts, Virginia Commonwealth University, Richmond, Volume 1, No. 2 December 16, 2002
Emerson, Claudia, "Poems: The Bat, Pitching Horseshoes, Possessions, Surface Hunting", Blackbird: An Online Journal of Literature and the Arts, Virginia Commonwealth University, Richmond, Volume 2, No. 1, (Spring, 2003)
Chappell, Fred, "Same mine yields different gems," Raleigh News and Observer review of The Late Wife on December 25, 2005.
Fellowship of Southern Writers Members Profile page
"Poets in Person: Claudia Emerson" , HD Video in Fredericksburg, VA with Claudia and husband musician Kent Ippolito, The Cortland Review – Spring 2012 Feature, April 8, 2012.
"Shot Her Dead" , an original song performed by Claudia Emerson and Kent Ippolito, The Cortland Review – Spring 2012 Feature, April 8, 2012.
5 new poems in text and audio , The Cortland Review – Spring 2012 Feature, April 8, 2012.
Reid, Zachary, "2 Pulitzer Prize poetry winners to read at VCU event Wednesday", Richmond Times-Dispatch, September 14, 2014.

1957 births
2014 deaths
American women poets
Deaths from cancer in Virginia
Deaths from colorectal cancer
People from Chatham, Virginia
Poets Laureate of Virginia
Pulitzer Prize for Poetry winners
The New Yorker people
University of North Carolina at Greensboro alumni
University of Virginia alumni
Virginia Commonwealth University faculty
Writers from Virginia
20th-century American poets
20th-century American women writers
Writers of American Southern literature
21st-century American poets
21st-century American women writers
American women academics